Geodetic Glacier is a glacier flowing east from Bettle Peak along the north side of the Thomas Heights into Bowers Piedmont Glacier, on the Scott Coast of Victoria Land, Antarctica. The name is one of a group in the area associated with surveying applied in 1993 by the New Zealand Geographic Board, and comes from geodesy, the branch of applied mathematics concerned with measuring, or determining the shape of the earth, and the precise location of points on its surface.

References

Glaciers of Victoria Land
Scott Coast